The Royal Newcastle Hospital was, for nearly 190 years, the main hospital in the Australian city of Newcastle. The hospital stood on a hill overlooking the Pacific Ocean and the Hunter River port of Newcastle, New South Wales, from 1817 until 2007. The hospital grew in step with Newcastle from its founding as a penal settlement and coal port. The first hospital on the site was built by and for convicts. They were followed by generations of patients, staff and supporters who were involved with an expanding seaport hospital and its many campuses. The hospital in turn had a powerful influence on the East End of central Newcastle and portside communities and on people's wellbeing throughout the Hunter Valley. During the mid to late twentieth century, under visionary medical superintendent, Chris McCaffrey, the hospital became a major centre for innovation in Australian healthcare, introducing reforms in specialist medical care and records keeping.

By 2007, the year it closed, the Royal Newcastle was one of the oldest, largest and best-known hospitals in Australia. Redevelopment of the hospital site began in 2008 and, with the exception of the North Wing (opened in 1915) and the nurses' homes, much of the site was replaced by apartments. The hospital re-opened in the Royal Newcastle Centre at the site of the John Hunter Hospital in New Lambton Heights.

References

 Susan Marsden assisted by Cynthia Hunter The Royal: a castle grand, a purpose noble. A history of the Royal Newcastle Hospital 1817-2005 Newcastle: Hunter New England Area Health Service, 2005 
 Susan Marsden The Seaport Hospital 1817-2007 Sydney: Mirvac Pty Ltd, 2010 
 

Hospitals in New South Wales
History of Newcastle, New South Wales
Organisations based in Australia with royal patronage
Buildings and structures in Newcastle, New South Wales